Oat (plural: oats) is a cereal grain crop.

Oat or Oats may also refer to:

People with the name
Carleton Oats (born 1942), American football player
Francis Oats (born 1848 – died 1918), was a Cornish miner who became chairman of De Beers diamond company.
Nate Oats (born 1974), American basketball coach

Fictional characters

 Col. Oats, a character in the 1991 American science fiction comedy film Bill & Ted's Bogus Journey
 Mightily Oats, a character in the Terry Pratchett novel Carpe Jugulum

Other uses 
 OATS, Open Source Assistive Technology Software, a source code repository
 Oats (horse), a racehorse
 Obligation assimilable du Trésor, a French government bond
 Occupied Arab Territories, a designation used by the United Nations that refers to territories that are occupied by Israel after the Six-Day War.
 Ohio Achievement Test, now the Ohio Achievement Assessment
 Operational acceptance testing
 Optometry Admission Test, the widely used test for admission to a school of optometry
 Ornithine aminotransferase, an enzyme
 Outside air temperature
 Overseas Adventure Travel, an American travel agency
 Oxford Aviation Training, now Oxford Aviation Academy
 Organic acid technology in antifreeze
 Oats Studios, a science-fiction film studio started by Neill Blomkamp
 Scarborough Open Air Theatre, commonly abbreviated to OAT
 Old Anatolian Turkish, an extinct Turkic language

See also
Oates (disambiguation)
Omicron Alpha Tau
Oat Hills (disambiguation)
Oat Mountain
Oatmeal (disambiguation)